Horsehead may refer to:
 The head of a horse
 Horsehead (band), an Australian rock band
 Horsehead Corporation, an American corporation producing zinc products
 Horsehead Nebula, a dark nebula in the constellation of Orion
 A pumpjack, or horsehead, part of an oilwell's pump
 Horse Head, an American musician who is a member of the collective GothBoiClique

See also
 Horse Head (disambiguation)
 Horse head mask
 Horseheads, New York
 Hogshead